Desulfofrigus  is a Gram-negative, strictly anaerobic and non-spore-forming bacteria genus from the family of Desulfobacteraceae.

References

Further reading 
 

Desulfobacterales
Bacteria genera